Incheon Bridge (인천대교) is a cable-stayed bridge in Incheon.

Incheon Bridge may also refer to:

Incheon Bridge Expressway (인천대교고속도로), a segment of the Second Gyeongin Expressway
Incheon Bridge Co., Ltd. (인천대교 주식회사), the company that built and operates the Incheon Bridge
Incheongyo (Incheon) (인천교), a bridge in Incheon
Incheongyo (Nonsan) (인천교), a bridge in Nonsan
Incheongyo (Gyeongju) (인천교), a bridge in Gyeongju